Thomas-James Everton "TJ" Bramble (born 9 May 2001) is a professional footballer who last played for Dover Athletic. Born in England, he represents the Antigua and Barbuda national football team.

Club career

Gillingham
Bramble began his career as a youth team player for Gillingham.  In February 2019, he joined Deal Town on a 28-day work experience agreement. Bramble signed his first professional contract with Gillingham in May 2019.  On 1 November 2019, he joined East Grinstead Town on loan. He played seven games for the club and scored two goals.

On 22 February 2020, Bramble joined Sittingbourne on loan. He was released by Gillingham in June 2020 without ever having played for the first team.

Dover Athletic
On 27 August 2020, Bramble signed for National League club Dover Athletic. He made his club debut on the opening day of the season in a 1–0 victory over Notts County. On 24 October 2020, Bramble scored his first goal for the club, the final goal in a 3–3 draw with Yeovil Town in the FA Cup; Dover lost the tie on penalties. Bramble was released by the club at the end of the 2021–22 season following relegation, being offered the chance to come back for pre-season and prove his fitness.

International career
In March 2018, Bramble was called up to the Antigua and Barbuda team for a pair of friendlies against Bermuda and Jamaica. He made his debut in a 3–2 win over Bermuda on 22 March.

Later the same year he featured for the Benna Boys in the 2018 CONCACAF U-20 Championship in the United States, scoring in a win over Sint Maarten and a loss to Honduras in the group stage.

He also has recently been called up for the U20 for the CONCACAF tournament.

Career statistics

References

External links
 NFT Profile

2001 births
Living people
Sportspeople from Dartford
Footballers from Kent
Antigua and Barbuda footballers
Antigua and Barbuda international footballers
Antigua and Barbuda under-20 international footballers
English footballers
Association football midfielders
Gillingham F.C. players
East Grinstead Town F.C. players
Deal Town F.C. players
Sittingbourne F.C. players
Dover Athletic F.C. players
Isthmian League players
National League (English football) players
English sportspeople of Antigua and Barbuda descent